Wanker is a pejorative term.

Wanker may also refer to:

Wanker (surname)
Cockney Wanker, a character from the British comic magazine Viz
Golf Wanker - someone who continually hits the ball down the middle of each fairway
Wanker Records, an independent record label
Wanker County, Wisconsin, the fictional place of origin of Peggy Bundy, née Wanker, in Married ... with Children

See also
www.tism.wanker.com, a 1999 album by Australian alternative rock group TISM
Malakas the Greek equivalent of wanker from the bad meaning
Wank (disambiguation)
Wanka (disambiguation)
Wanké